Carlos Edilson Alcântara Morais (born 16 October 1985) is an Angolan basketball player for the Petro de Luanda of the Angolan Basketball League. A  shooting guard, he has represented Angola at several international competitions.

Early career
Morais left for the United States in 2004 to attend Community Christian School in Stockbridge, Georgia. He had the option to play college basketball after, but chose to sign a professional contract.

Professional career

Angola (2001–2016) 
Morais started his professional career with Angolan powerhouse Petro de Luanda.

Toronto Raptors (2013) 
On September 19, 2013, Morais signed a non-guaranteed contract with the Toronto Raptors. He was later waived by the Raptors on October 26. He played in three pre-season games with Toronto and totalled 6 points in 21 minutes.

Benfica (2016–2018) 
In 2016, Morais signed a two-year deal with Portuguese side Benfica. He played in the Liga Portuguesa de Basquetebol (LPB) and was named an All-Star in two consecutive seasons (in 2017 and 2018). Morais also guided Benfica to the Portuguese Cup title and was named MVP of the tournament in 2017.

Mens Sana Siena (2018–2019) 
On July 22, 2018, Morais signed with Italian club Mens Sana of the second level Serie A2. In March 2019, the team was dismantled and excluded from the Series A2 due to economic issues.

Return to Angola (2019–present) 
On February 25, 2019, Morais returned to Petro de Luanda for a third stint with the team.

In the 2021–22 season, Morais won the national treble with Angola winning the league, cup and supercut competitions. They also reached the 2022 BAL Finals where they lost to US Monastir. Morais was selected to the All-BAL First Team for the first time.

National team career 
Morais has been a member of the Angola national basketball team. He played for his country at the 2008 Olympics in Beijing. He has won four AfroBasket gold medals with Angola, in 2005, 2007, 2019 and 2013.

Achievements

Titles Won

BAL career statistics

|-
|style="text-align:left;"|2021
|style="text-align:left;"|Petro de Luanda
| 6 || 6 || 26.0 || .343 || .341 || .700 || 3.8 || 1.5 || 1.3 || .0 || 11.5
|- class="sortbottom"
| style="text-align:center;" colspan="2"|Career
| 6 || 6 || 26.0 || .343 || .341 || .700 || 3.8 || 1.5 || 1.3 || .0 || 11.5

References

External links
 

1985 births
Living people
Angolan expatriate basketball people in Portugal
Angolan expatriate basketball people in the United States
Angolan men's basketball players
Atlético Petróleos de Luanda basketball players
Basketball players at the 2008 Summer Olympics
C.R.D. Libolo basketball players
Olympic basketball players of Angola
Shooting guards
S.L. Benfica basketball players
Mens Sana Basket players
Basketball players from Luanda
2006 FIBA World Championship players
2010 FIBA World Championship players
2019 FIBA Basketball World Cup players